Melaleuca procera is a plant in the myrtle family, Myrtaceae and is endemic to the south-west of Western Australia. It is an erect, spindly shrub with cylinder-shaped leaves and heads of pinkish flowers in later spring or early summer.

Description

The flowers are a shade of pink to mauve, arranged in heads on the ends of branches which continue to grow after flowering and sometimes also in the upper leaf axils. The outer surface of the flower cup (the hypanthium) is hairy. There are five bundles of stamens around the flower, each with 8 to 10 stamens.

Taxonomy and naming
Melaleuca procera was first formally described in 1999 by Lyndley Craven in Australian Systematic Botany from a specimen collected on the Lake King to Norseman road. The specific epithet (procera) is derived from Latin word procerus meaning  “tall” or "slender", referring to the slender habit of this species.

Distribution and habitat
Melaleuca procera occurs in and between the Kulin, Kalgarin and Lake Grace districts in the Avon Wheatbelt and Mallee biogeographic regions. It grows in sandy loam and gravel in low open heath.

Conservation
Melaleuca procera is listed as "not threatened" by the Government of Western Australia Department of Parks and Wildlife.

References

procera
Plants described in 1999
Endemic flora of Western Australia
Taxa named by Lyndley Craven